Elkin Gilberto Barrera Chapparo (born July 6, 1971 in Sogamoso, Boyacá) is a retired male road cyclist from Colombia, who was a professional rider from 1995 to 2000.

Career

1995
4th in General Classification Vuelta a Colombia (COL)
1996
1st in Stage 10 Vuelta a Colombia, Cali (COL)
4th in General Classification Vuelta a Colombia (COL)
1997
1st in Stage 5 Vuelta a Colombia, Sevilla (COL)
2000
1st in Stage 7 Clásico RCN, Madrid (COL)

References
 

1971 births
Living people
People from Sogamoso
Colombian male cyclists
Vuelta a Colombia stage winners
Sportspeople from Boyacá Department